Jack Weinstein is a retired lieutenant general in the United States Air Force. His final post was as the Deputy Chief of Staff for Strategic Deterrence and Nuclear Integration, Headquarters U. S. Air Force, Washington D.C. In this capacity, Weinstein was responsible to the Secretary and Chief of Staff of the Air Force for focus on Nuclear Deterrence Operations. Previously he was Commander, Twentieth Air Force, part of the Air Force Global Strike Command, and Commander, Task Force 214, part of the U.S. Strategic Command, at Francis E. Warren Air Force Base, in Wyoming.

Career
Weinstein joined the Air Force in 1982. He then began training at Vandenberg Air Force Base. The following year, he was stationed at Grand Forks Air Force Base. He remained there until 1988, at which time he returned to Vandenberg Air Force Base and was assigned to the 1st Strategic Aerospace Division. In 1991, he became executive officer of the Twentieth Air Force at Vandenberg.

In 1992, Weinstein was assigned to Air Combat Command. The following year, he transferred to Air Force Space Command. From 1995 to 1997, he was an ICBM requirements officer and Deputy Chief of Staff of United States Strategic Command. He then joined the 12th Space Warning Squadron at Thule Air Base in Greenland. After returning for a time to United States Strategic Command, Weinstein assumed command of the 90th Operations Group at Francis E. Warren Air Force Base in 2003. In 2005, he returned again to Vandenberg Air Force Base, where he assumed command of the 30th Space Wing. Also during this time, Weinstein was deployed overseas to serve as Director of Space Forces in the War in Afghanistan (2001–present) and the Iraq War.

In 2007, he returned to Air Force Space Command as Director of Plans, Programs and Analyses.

In October 2013, Weinstein was selected by Lt. General James Kowalski, the commander of the Air Force Global Strike to replace Maj. Gen. Michael Carey as Commander, Twentieth Air Force, Air Force Global Strike Command, and Commander, Task Force 214, U.S. Strategic Command.

On 11 April 2014 General Weinstein was responsible for the firing of nine Air Force commanders in Malmstrom AFB, Montana.

In March 2017, Weinstein attended the Exchange Monitor Nuclear Deterrence Summit in Washington DC. When questioned there about the New START treaty, he said, "The reason you do a treaty is not to cut forces but to maintain strategic stability among world powers. And the New START treaty allowed us to maintain [that stability]. I think there is a huge value with what the New START treaty has provided." DefenseNews.com pointed out that this is in contrast to statements made by US President Donald J Trump who, in an interview with Reuters on 22 February 2017, called the New START treaty a "one-sided deal" and a "bad deal".

Awards and decorations

Education
University of Massachusetts Lowell
Embry-Riddle Aeronautical University
John F. Kennedy School of Government - Harvard University
Squadron Officer School
Air Command and Staff College
Industrial College of the Armed Forces

References

Jewish American military personnel
United States Air Force generals
Recipients of the Defense Superior Service Medal
Recipients of the Legion of Merit
United States Air Force personnel of the War in Afghanistan (2001–2021)
United States Air Force personnel of the Iraq War
University of Massachusetts Lowell alumni
Embry–Riddle Aeronautical University alumni
Harvard Kennedy School alumni
Air Command and Staff College alumni
Dwight D. Eisenhower School for National Security and Resource Strategy alumni
Living people
Place of birth missing (living people)
Year of birth missing (living people)